The A5124 is a road in Shropshire, England, that forms part of the northern section of the Shrewsbury by-pass. It is known locally as the Battlefield Link Road.

It links the A528 (at Ellesmere Road Roundabout) with the A49 and A53 (at Battlefield Roundabout).

The current road was built in 1998, though the A5124 had a former route along Harlescott Lane, further towards the town centre of Shrewsbury. However, this road was too narrow, had a railway crossing and passed through a residential area. It is now unclassified.

The current road passes under the Welsh Marches Line ("Battlefield Bridge") and also forms the northern edge of the Battlefield Enterprise Park.

References 

1998 establishments in England
Transport in Shropshire
Roads in England